The Jiangshanian is the middle stage of the Furongian series. It follows the Paibian Stage and is succeeded by the still unnamed Stage 10 of the Cambrian. The base is defined as the first appearance of the trilobite Agnostotes orientalis which is estimated to be  million years ago. The Jiangshanian lasted until approximately  million years ago.

The Cambrian stage was named after Jiangshan, a city in China's Zhejiang province.

The GSSP of the Jiangshanian is the "Duibian B Section", west of the village of Duibian(碓边), and 10 km north of Jiangshan. The outcrop belongs to the Huayansi Formation(华严寺组).

References 

 
Cambrian geochronology
Geological ages